Dunley is a hamlet in the Basingstoke and Deane district of Hampshire, England. It is in the civil parish of Litchfield and Woodcott. Its nearest town is Whitchurch, which lies approximately 3.7 miles (5.6 km) south-east from the village.

External links

Villages in Hampshire